Monochrom (stylised as monochrom) is an international art-technology-philosophy group, publishing house and film production company. It was founded in 1993, and defines itself as "an unpeculiar mixture of proto-aesthetic fringe work, pop attitude, subcultural science and political activism". Its main office is located at Museumsquartier/Vienna (at 'Q21').

The group's members are: Johannes Grenzfurthner, Evelyn Fürlinger, Harald Homolka-List, Anika Kronberger, Franz Ablinger, Frank Apunkt Schneider, Daniel Fabry, Günther Friesinger and Roland Gratzer.

The group is known for working with different media and entertainment formats, although many projects are performative and have a strong focus on a critical and educational narrative. Johannes Grenzfurthner calls this "looking for the best weapon of mass distribution of an idea". Monochrom is openly left-wing and tries to encourage public debate, sometimes using subversive affirmation or over-affirmation as a tactic. The group popularized the concept of "context hacking".

On the occasion of Monochrom's 20th birthday in 2013, several Austrian high-profile media outlets paid tribute to the group's pioneering contributions within the field of contemporary art and discourse.

History and philosophy 

In the early 1990s, Johannes Grenzfurthner was an active member of several BBS message boards. He used his online connections to create a zine or alternative magazine that dealt with art, technology and subversive cultures, and was influenced by US magazines like Mondo 2000. Grenzfurthner's motivations were to react to the emerging conservatism in cyber-cultures of the early 1990s and to combine his political background in the Austrian punk and antifa movement with discussion of new technologies and the cultures they create. Franz Ablinger joined Grenzfurthner and they became the publication's core team.The first issue was released in 1993. Over the years the publication featured many interviews and essays, for example by Bruce Sterling, HR Giger, Richard Kadrey, Arthur Kroker, Negativland, Kathy Acker, Michael Marrak, DJ Spooky, Geert Lovink, Lars Gustafsson, Tony Serra, Friedrich Kittler, Jörg Buttgereit, Eric Drexler, Terry Pratchett, Jack Sargeant and Bob Black, in its specific experimental layout style.

In 1995 the group decided to cover new artistic practices and started experimenting with different media: performances, computer games, robots, puppet theater, musical, short films, pranks, conferences, online activism.

In 1995 we decided that we didn't want to constrain ourselves to just one media format (the "fanzine"). We knew that we wanted to create statements, create viral information. So a quest for the best "Weapon of Mass Distribution" started, a search for the best transportation mode for a certain politics of philosophical ideas. This was the Cambrian Explosion of monochrom. We wanted to experiment, try stuff, find new forms of telling our stories. But, to be clear, it was (and still is) not about keeping the pace, of staying up-to-date, or (even worse) staying "fresh". The emergence of new media (and therefore artistic) formats is certainly interesting. But etching information into copper plates is just as exciting. We think that the perpetual return of 'the new', to cite Walter Benjamin, is nothing to write home about - except perhaps for the slave-drivers in the fashion industry. We've never been interested in the new just in itself, but in the accidental occurrence. In the moment where things don't tally, where productive confusion arises.

All the other core team members joined between 1995 and 2006.

Grenzfurthner is the group's artistic director. He defines Monochrom's artistic and activist approach as 'Context hacking' or 'Urban Hacking'.

The group monochrom refers to its working method as "Context Hacking," thus referencing the hacker culture, which propagates a creative and emancipatory approach to the technologies of the digital age, and in this way turns against the continuation into the digital age of centuries-old technological enslavement perpetrated through knowledge and hierarchies of experts. ... Context hacking transfers the hackers' objectives and methods to the network of social relationships in which artistic production occurs, and upon which it is dependent. ... One of context hackers' central ambitions is to bring the factions of counterculture, which have veered off along widely diverging trajectories, back together again.

Community and network 

From its very foundation, the group defined itself as a movement, culture (referring to Iain M. Banks's sci-fi series) and "open field of experimentation". Monochrom supported and supports various artists, activists, researchers and communities with an online publishing platform, a print publishing service (edition mono), and organizes in-person meetings, screenings, radio shows, debate circles, conferences, online platforms. It is fundamental for the group's core members to combine artistic and educational endeavors with community work (cf. social practice).

Some collaborations have been rather short-lived (for example the publication of a 1993 fringe science paper by Jakob Segal, projects with the Billboard Liberation Front and Ubermorgen or the administration of Dorkbot Vienna), some have been going for many years and decades (for example with Michael Marrak, Cory Doctorow, Jon Lebkowsky, Fritz Ostermayer, V. Vale, eSeL, Scott Beale/Laughing Squid, Machine Project, Emmanuel Goldstein, Jason Scott, Jonathan Mann, Jasmin Hagendorfer and the Porn Film Festival Vienna), Michael Zeltner, Anouk Wipprecht, VSL Lindabrunn).

Monochrom supports initiatives like the Radius Festival, Play:Vienna, the Buckminster Fuller Institute Austria, RE/Search, the Semantic Web Company and the Vienna hackerspace Metalab. For a couple of years, Monochrom ran the DIY project "Hackbus" in cooperation with David "Daddy D" Dempsey (of FM4)

Since 2007, Monochrom is the European correspondent for Boing Boing Video.

Art residency 

Monochrom offers a collaborative art residency in Vienna. Since 2003 the group has invited and created projects with artists, researchers, and activists like Suhrkamp's Johannes Ullmaier, pop theorist Stefan Tiron, performance artist Angela Dorrer, DIY blogger (and later: entrepreneur) Bre Pettis, photographer and activist Audrey Penven, digital artist Eddie Codel, sex work activist Maggie Mayhem, glitch artist Phil Stearns, illustrator Josh Ellingson, DIY artist Ryan Finnigan, digital artist Jane Tingley, digital rights activist Jacob Appelbaum, sex tech expert Kyle Machulis, hacker Nick Farr, filmmakers Sophia Cacciola and Michael J. Epstein, writer Jack Sargeant, and others.All former resident artists are considered ambassadors.

Johannes Grenzfurthner sees Monochrom as a community and social incubator of critical and subversive thinkers. An example is Bre Pettis of MakerBot Industries, who got inspired to create 3d printers during his art residency with Monochrom in 2007. Pettis wanted to create a robot that could print shot glasses for Monochrom's cocktail-robot event Roboexotica and did research about the RepRap project at Metalab. Shot glasses remained a theme throughout the history of MakerBot.

Main projects (in chronological order) 
 Mackerel Fiddlers (1996-)
 A radical anti-representation/anti-recording music movement that partially refers to Hakim Bey's Temporary Autonomous Zone. To quote the manifesto: "We set value on developing a form of viral resistance by systematic infiltration of symphonic orchestras. A New Year's Concert of the Vienna Philharmonic Orchestra (1984) could have been transformed by at least one Mackerel Fiddler and Austria's image would have been ruined worldwide. ... These days, self-production and 'embarrassment sells' have become the golden rules of media, be it radio, TV, or telegraph. Thus it is not only legitimate to be ashamed of ones activity as a Mackerel Fiddler, it is also thankworthy. Failure is beautiful! Disgrace is sunshine!"
 Schubumkehr (1995–1996)
 A manifesto propagating 'internet demarketing' and deals with negative aspects of early net culture. Paz Sastre reprinted and contextualized the manifesto in this 2021 publication "Manifiestos sobre el arte y la red 1990-1999", published by Exit Media.
 Der Exot (1997–2012) 
 A telerobot remotely controlled via a web interface/chat forum. The robot was supported and operated by a big community. The robot's basic structure was built out of remodeled Lego bricks and equipped with a Fisheye lens camera. The project was the first telerobot/tele-community projects of its kind. It was presented at art festivals and technology presentations.
 Monochrom relaunched the project in 2011, calling it a "resurrection", and specifying the social aspect of the project: "A mobile robot with a mounted camera that can be controlled via web interface. But that's tricky. If too many people try to control the robot at the same time it is counter-productive. ... Der Exot is the anti-crowd source robot. The users have to discuss and cooperate via a chat interface to communicate where they want to go, what corners they want to explore, what to crush." The project was presented at the 'Robotville' Exhibition of the Science Museum London.
 Wir kaufen Seelen (We Buy Souls) (1998)
 A "spirituo-capitalist" booth where project members tried to buy the souls of passers-by for US$5 per soul. A total of fifteen were purchased and registered. These souls are still being offered for sale to third parties with a power of disposal.
 Roboexotica (1999-) 
 An annual festival where scientists, researchers, computer geeks and artists from all over the world  build cocktail robots and discuss technological innovation, futurology and science fiction. Roboexotica is also an ironic attempt to criticize techno-triumphalism and to dissect technological hypes. 2002 Monochrom teamed up with Shifz in the organization of the events. Roboexotica has been featured on Slashdot, Wired News, Reuters, New York Times and blogs like Boing Boing and New Scientist.
 Minus 24x (2001)
 Monochrom's pro-failure/pro-error/pro-inability manifesto, hailing the "Luddites of inability". Quote: "Turning an object against the use inscribed in it (as sociolect of the world of things) means probing its possibilities. ... The information age is an age of permanently getting stuck. Greater and greater speed is demanded. New software, new hardware, new structures, new cultural techniques. Lifelong learning? Yes. But the company can't fire the secretary every six months, just because she can't cope with the new version of Excel. They can count their keystrokes, measure their productivity ... but! They will never be able to sanction their inability! Because that is imminent."
 Scrotum gegen votum (Scrotum for a vote) (2000-)
 "A form of political commentary for "about fifty percent of the population". Masculine individuals (whether in sex or gender) are seated nude in a special chair attached to a flatbed scanner. The scans then may or may not be sent to various politicians. The project won the NEBAPOMIC 2000 (Network-based Political Minimalism Counteraction Award) in the category of small country with political tendencies towards the conservative right.
 Soviet Unterzoegersdorf (1999-) 
 In 2005 Monochrom presented the first part of a computer game trilogy: "Soviet Unterzoegersdorf - The Adventure Game" (using AGS). To Monochrom it was clear that the adventure game, an almost extinct form of computer game, would provide the perfect media platform to communicate the idea of "Soviet Unterzoegersdorf". Edge chose the game as their 'internet game of the month' of November 2005.
 In 2011 Monochrom and Austrian production company Golden Girls Filmproduktion announced that they are working on the feature film Sierra Zulu. The movie will be dealing with Soviet Unterzoegersdorf. In 2012 Monochrom presented the 16-minute short film "Earthmoving". It is a prequel to the feature film Sierra Zulu and features actors Jeff Ricketts, Martin Auer, Lynsey Thurgar, Adrienne Ferguson and Alexander Fennon.
 In March 2009 Monochrom presented 'Soviet Unterzoegersdorf: Sector II'. The game features special guest appearances of Cory Doctorow, Bruce Sterling, Jello Biafra, Jason Scott, Bre Pettis and MC Frontalot.
 The fake history of the "last existing appanage republic of the USSR", Soviet Unterzoegersdorf. Created to discuss topics such as the theoretical problems of historiography, the concept of the "socialist utopia" and the political struggles of postwar Europe. The theoretical concept was transformed into an improvisational theatre/performance/LARP that lasted two days.
 Georg Paul Thomann (2002–2005) 
 Monochrom was chosen to represent the Republic of Austria at the São Paulo Art Biennial, São Paulo (Brazil) in 2002.  However, the political climate in Austria (at that time, the center-right People's Party had recently formed a coalition with Jörg Haider's radical-right Austrian Freedom Party) gave the left-wing art group concerns about acting as wholehearted representatives of their nation. Monochrom dealt with the conundrum by creating the persona of Georg P. Thomann, an irascible, controversial (and completely fictitious) artist of longstanding fame and renown. Through the implementation of this ironic mechanism - even the catalogue included the biography of the non-existent artist - the group solved with pure fiction the philosophical and bureaucratic dilemma attached to the system of representation presented to them by the Biennial.
 An interesting story related to the Thomann project took place once the São Paulo Art Biennial was underway. The artist Chien-Chi Chang was invited as the representative of Taiwan, but the country's name was removed by the administration from his cube overnight and replaced by the label, "Museum of Fine Arts, Taipei." As the members of Monochrom discovered, China had threatened to retreat from the Biennial (and create massive diplomatic problems) if the organizers of the Biennial were thought to be challenging the "One-China policy." Chang's open letter remained unanswered. Under the guise of Thomann, Monochrom invited artists from several countries to show their solidarity with Chang by taking the adhesive letters from their countries' name tags and giving them to Chang so that he could remount "Taiwan" outside his room. Monochrom wanted to show that artists do not necessarily have to internalize the fragmentation and isolation imposed by the rat-race of art markets and exhibitions as society-controlling imperatives. Several Asian newspapers reported about the performance. One Taiwanese newspaper headlined: "Austrian artist Georg Paul Thomann saves 'Taiwan'".
 In 2005 Monochrom released press info that "Austrian artist and writer Prof. Georg Paul Thomann died in a tragic accident at the tender age of 60". On 29 July 2005 they staged his funeral in Hall in Tirol. Thomann's gravesite remains in Hall. Georg Paul Thomann's tombstone shows an engraved URL of the Thomann project page.
 Georg Paul Thomann is featured in RE/Search's "Pranks 2" book.
 452 x 157 cm^2 global durability (2002-)
 Together with Patick Hoenninger. Milk packages are collected in many countries. The standardized format of the Tetra Pak offers a worldwide frame for creative variation, which becomes visible on the 9.5 by 16.5 cm front of the packaging. According to the group, the relation to pop art not only exists in an aesthetic but also in a social dimension, reminiscent of Walter Benjamin's "The Work of Art in the Age of Its Technological Reproducibility."
 The Absent Quintessence (2002)
 Feature films were drastically cut and thereby wrenched out of their genres (hardcore porn, splatter, eastern/kung fu, zombie, etc.). These genre films – all of which are characterized by certain anonymity and a mass-produced look – have been stripped of their "essential" scenes (for example, all sex scenes in pornography, all fight scenes in the kung fu films). Thus, the material has been reduced to a bare-bones plot that had actually been conceived only as filler, but its aesthetics and stereotypical narrative patterns now make it easy to contextualize. The project tried to analyze these "re-released" shorts and to filter out interesting subtexts.
 Towers of Hanoi (2002)
 Members of the group entered a bank and exchanged 50 euros for dollars, then back again to euros - and so on - until the money was gone. Afterward the group calculated how many times you have to exchange the global amount of cash (20 trillion euros) from euros to dollars until it vanishes completely. It was calculated that if this process was completed a total of 849 times using the global amount of cash, 18 cents would remain.
 Blattoptera (2003–2005) 
 Artists were invited to design a gallery-space for their tribe of South American cockroaches. Each month a different international artist, or arts group, was invited to design an environment in which the cockroaches are placed, to act as audience for, and as aesthetic judges of the work.
 Brandmarker (2003-)
 How well do people remember the logos of large corporations that sell consumer goods? An attempt to evaluate the actual power of commercial brands by making people draw famous logos from memory.
 Eignblunzn (2003)
 Members of the group prepared blood sausage out of their own blood and ate it ('auto blood sausage'). The performance was accompanied by political essays about the 'autocannibalistic' tendencies of the global economy. The event also can be interpreted as a critical statement about art, art history, and the art market (Viennese Actionism).
 Instant Blitz Copy Fight (2004-)
 People from all over the world are asked to take flash pictures of copyright warnings in movie theaters. Monochrom (in cooperation with Cory Doctorow) collects and exhibits those pictures as a copyleft/Free Culture statement.
 The Flower Currency (2005)
 A project to explore a value exchange system, created and owned by children, to enable artists to collaborate on the creation of interdisciplinary artworks.
 Udo 77 (2004)
 A musical about Udo Proksch, a criminal figure in recent Austrian history. Born to a poor family he rose to become the darling of Austrian high society before landing in jail on a life sentence for sinking a ship and its crew in order to cash in on insurance of nonexistent goods. His perfectly tuned network of sponsors, friends, and political functionaries could not hush up the scandal and many of his associates joined him in his fall from grace.
 1 Baud (2005)
 Monochrom held workshops in San Francisco to teach people semaphore communication techniques ('International Code of Signals'). After a few days set aside for study and practice, they started a citywide performance to send messages through town at a speed of 1 baud. ("1 Baud" was part of the "Experience The Experience" tour.)
  Brick Of Coke  (2005)
 Monochrom created a 'Brick Of Coke': they put twenty gallons of Coca-Cola into a pot and boiled it down for a week until the residue left behind could be molded into a brick. The performance and talk dealt with the sugar industry and other multinational corporation policies and Coca-Cola as a symbol of corporate power. ("Brick Of Coke" was part of the "Experience The Experience" tour.)
 Buried Alive/Six Feet Under Club (2005-) 
 In 2010 Monochrom created the "Six Feet Under Club". Couples could volunteer to be buried together in a casket beneath the ground to perform sexual acts. In a press release they explained that the space they occupy is "extremely private and intimate". The coffin "is a reminder of the social norm of exclusive pair bonding 'till death do us part'." However, this intimate scene was corrupted by the presence of a night vision webcam which projects the scene on to an outside wall. The scenario kept the intimacy of a sexual moment intact while moving the private act into public space. Monochrom's performance can be seen as an absurd parody of pornographic cinema or an examination of the high value placed on sexual privacy. "Six Feet Under Club" performances took place in San Francisco in 2010 and Vienna in 2013 and 2014.
 People in Los Angeles, San Francisco, Vancouver and Toronto had the opportunity to be buried alive in a real coffin for fifteen minutes. As a framework program Monochrom members held lectures about the history of the science of determining death and the medical cultural history of "buried alive". ("Buried Alive" was launched as part of the "Experience The Experience" tour in 2005, but was extended beyond the tour and became a permanent coffin installation at VSL Lindabrunn in Lower Austria in 2013.
 Catapulting Wireless Devices (2005)
 The catapult is one of the oldest machines in the history of technology. Monochrom created an ironic statement about progress. The group build a small medieval trebuchet and used a couple of issues of the techno-utopist magazine Wired as a counterweight to catapult wireless devices (e.g. cell phones or PDAs) at the greatest possible distance. ("Catapulting Wireless Devices" was part of the "Experience The Experience" tour.)
 Farewell to Overhead (2005)
 The group created a melancholic electro pop song about the "dead medium" overhead projector and adolescence/socialisation.
 Growing Money (2005)
 To quote Monochrom's press statement: "Money is frozen desire. Thus it governs the world. Money is used for all forms of trade, from daily shopping at the supermarket to trafficking in human beings and drugs. In the course of all these transactions, our money wears out quickly, especially the smaller banknotes that are changing hands constantly. ... Money is dirty, and thus it is a living entity. This is something we take literally: money is an ideal environment for microscopic organisms and bacteria. We want to make your money grow. In a potent nutrient fluid under heat lamps we want to get as much life as we can out of your dollar bills." ("Growing Money" was part of the "Experience The Experience" tour.)
 Illegal Space Race (2005)
 Monochrom placed the planets true to scale (sun, 4 meters in diameter at Machine Gallery, Alvarado Street, near Echo Park) throughout the Los Angeles cityscape. Then they conducted an 'illegal space car race' through the solar system. ("Illegal Space Race" was part of the "Experience The Experience" tour.)
 Magnetism Party (2005)
 In form of a staged college party, Monochrom deleted all the electromagnetic storage media that they could find with a couple of heavy-duty neodymium magnets. Monochrom stated that the Magnetism Party was an attempt to actively come to terms with one aspect of the information society that is almost completely ignored by our epistemological machinery: forgetting. The slogan was "Delete is just another word for nothing left to lose". ("Magnetism Party" was part of the "Experience The Experience" tour.)
 Arad-II (2005): 
 The members of Monochrom staged a fake (public theatre performance) about a deadly virus outbreak at 'Art Basel Miami Beach', one of the biggest art fairs in North America. Monochrom dealt with the networking/business aspect of the art market, the post-September 11, 2001 attacks hysteria about biological warfare, and the media coverage about Avian influenza (bird flu). Press release quote: "In mid-November 2005, Günther Friesinger visited the Ulaangom Biennial in the Republic of Mongolia. ... He directly departed to Miami to attend some meetings at Art Basel Miami Beach. ... There is acute evidence that he is carrying a rare, but highly contagious sub-form of the Arad-II Virus (family Onoviridae), of which Freiburg virus is also a member. ... Friesinger is walking around the different art fairs in Miami Beach and is spreading the pathogen. The situation is critical. A worldwide outbreak – due to the many visitors from all over the world – is imminent. ... We want to find all the people that Günther Friesinger small talked to and handshaked with. We want to retrieve and destroy the business cards he has spread. Additionally, we must take him into custody and in the event of his death cremation is absolutely necessary."
 Café King Soccer (Café König Fußball) (2006)
 In June 2006, Monochrom created the art installation 'Café King Soccer' at NGBK Gallery in Berlin. The installation deals with the soccer corruption case in whose centre we find referee Robert Hoyzer. Monochrom reflect on the fact that soccer has at all times mirrored the dialectics between the culture of subjectivity of the working class and the assertion of objectivity of middle-class culture. The former is represented by the collectives that meet in the game, the latter by the referee, an exemplary civil subject conducting the game by acting as its objective opponent. The Hoyzer case violated this agreement. In it, Hoyzer is – especially in the forefront of the 2006 FIFA World Cup in Germany – also a tragic character, because he acted out his inner self-contradiction as an exemplary civil subject in a publicly effective way. At the same time, the Hoyzer case is itself an integral part of the game – merely because of his exemplary immolation as a scapegoat which seems to correspond exactly to his role on the field - and conditio sine qua non of its perpetuation.
 Campaign for the Abolition Of Personal Pronouns (2006):
 Monochrom propagates the creation of gender-neutral personal pronouns. In an activist way the group states that there is a relationship between the structure of language and the way people think and act (see Constructivism).
 Waiting for GOTO (2006):
 The reference point Monochrom chose for their theatre-project 'Waiting for GOTO' (Volkstheater Wien) is the theatre classic 'Waiting for Godot' which is projected into the future by modernistic references to science-fiction. In 'Waiting for Goto' we meet 'ideological delinquents' in a distant interstellar future who are separated from their bodies and locked up in two female students who are able to earn their college fees and make ends meet thanks to this job. The play presents us with Monochrom's portrayal of everyday work in a neo-liberal society, double consciousness, the endurance of incorporated contradictions by fragmented subjects, and the exploitation of the living body, self-alienation.
 Lord Jim Lodge powered by monochrom (2006-): 
The Lord Jim Lodge was founded during the 1980s by the artists Jörg Schlick, Martin Kippenberger, Albert Oehlen and Wolfgang Bauer. Every member was obliged to use the lodge logo and/or the "Sun Breasts Hammer" symbol and the slogan "No one helps nobody" in his work. The group's declared goal was to make the logo "more well known than that of Coca-Cola". Thanks to the international recognition received by the oeuvres of Kippenberger, Oehlen, and Schlick the Lord Jim Lodge has already attained a relatively high degree of notoriety. Still, the logo's dissemination has remained – despite the international reputation that these artists have achieved – within the framework of the art system and its peripheral importance. As an intentional addition to works of visual art, it was in the end limited by their material form of existence. In March 2006 it was announced that Monochrom has assumed ownership of all trademark and usage rights of the artist Jörg Schlick's Lord Jim Lodge. Monochrom took part in a contest by 'Coca-Cola Light' ('Coca-Cola Light Art Edition 2006'). Quote Monochrom: "This puts us in a position to set in motion long overdue synergy effects between Coca-Cola and the Lord Jim Lodge. The only possibility for realizing the challenge formulated in the lodge logo is to use habitat in the merchandise world as a vehicle of transmission for guiding the message through that world's channels of distribution and into public consciousness. ... Thus we would like to use the prize as a trial run for such a form of cooperation/competition. Coca-Cola and Lord Jim Lodge – together at last! The symbolic-economic capital of the Lord Jim Lodge and the economic-symbolic capital of Coca-Cola will be brought together, paving the way for a better future. For a world of radical beauty and exclusive bottles in small editions! In the end, we are all individuals – at least as long as nobody comes along and proves the contrary." Monochrom won the prize. The logo of "Lord Jim Lodge powered by monochrom" was printed on 50.000 Coca-Cola Light bottles.
 Taugshow (2006-):
Monochrom produce a regular TV talk show for a Viennese community TV station and put it online on their page under a Creative Commons license. Taugshow is referring to the Viennese slang term 'taugen' (to dig something, to adore something). Quote: "Our guests are geeks, heretics, and other coevals. Taugshow is a tour-de-farce, condensed into the well-known cultural technique of a prime time TV show." Guests are people like underground publisher V. Vale, sex activist and author Violet Blue, Chaos Computer Club spokesman Andy Müller-Maguhn, RepRap designer Vik Olliver, fashion researcher Adia Martin, media activist Eddie Codel, blog researcher Klaus Schönberger, computer crime lawyer Jennifer Granick, bondage instructor J. D. Lenzen, science researcher Karin Harrasser, blogger Regine Debatty, IT expert Emmanuel Goldstein, DEF CON founder Jeff Moss, Tim Pritlove and blogger/writer Cory Doctorow.
 Arse Elektronika (2007-): 
Monochrom organizes a series of conferences about sex and technology. The first conference was held in October 2007 in San Francisco and dealt with pr0nnovation (the history of pornography and technological innovation) and featured speakers such as Mark Dery, Violet Blue and Eon McKai.
Arse Elektronika 2008 dealt with Sex and Science Fiction ('Do Androids Sleep With Electric Sheep?') and was held in San Francisco in October 2008. It featured speakers like Rudy Rucker and Constance Penley.
The general theme of Arse Elektronika 2009 was 'Of Intercourse and Intracourse' (genetics, biotechnology, wetware, body modifications) and took place October 2009 in San Francisco. Featured guests: R. U. Sirius, Annalee Newitz, Allen Stein.
2010 the first Arse Elektronika exhibition was presented in the city of Hong Kong.
The theme of Arse Elektronika 2010 in San Francisco was "Space Racy" (Sex, Tech and Spaces).
The theme of Arse Elektronika 2011 in San Francisco was "Screw the System" (Sex, Tech class, and culture)
The theme of Arse Elektronika 2012 in San Francisco was "4PLAY: Gamifuckation and Its Discontents" (Sex, Tech and Games)
The theme of Arse Elektronika 2013 in San Francisco was "id/entity" (Sex, Tech and Identity)
The theme of Arse Elektronika 2014 in San Francisco was "trans*.*" (Sex, Tech and Transformations)
The theme of Arse Elektronika 2015 in San Francisco was "Shoot Your Workload" (Sex, Tech and Work)
Arse Elektronika compilations
There are currently four compilations or proceedings of essays presented at, or relevant to, the themes of Arse Elektronika.
 Sculpture Mobs (2008-): 
 Monochrom promotes a concept called Sculpture Mobs. At the 2008 Maker Faire in San Mateo, California Monochrom trained attendees to erect public sculptures in a simulated Wal-Mart parking lot in just 5 minutes before "security" was called. Quote: "No one is safe from public sculptures, those endless atrocities! All of them are labeled 'art in public space'. Unchallenging hunks of aesthetic metal in business parks, roundabouts, in shopping malls! It is time to create DIY public art! Get your hammers! Get your welding equipment!"
 Monochrom teamed up with the Billboard Liberation Front to create a political illegal public sculpture called "The Great Firewall of China" at the Google Campus in Mountain View, California.
 Monochrom created additional Sculpture Mobs and Sculpture Mob Training Camps in various cities: Graz (2008), Ljubljana (2008) and Barcelona (2010).
Der Streichelnazi / Nazi Petting Zoo (2008): 
 The group staged a public "Nazi petting" or "hugging" on a heavily frequented Viennese shopping street. The piece is a political and ironic statement about Austria's Nazi past and how Austria deals with it. Quote from their video documentation: "In 1938 Austria joined the Third Reich. Millions cheered Hitler and in the referendum, 99.75% said 'yes' to 'Greater Germany'. But after World War II, many Austrians sought comfort in the idea of Austria as "the Nazis' first victim". Factions of Austrian society tried for a long time to advance the view that it was only annexation at the point of a bayonet(te). But it's time to embrace history. It's time to remember the feel-good days of 1938. It's time to let our real feelings out! It's time to hug the Nazi, Austria! Finally!"
Carefully Selected Moments (2008):
 Monochrom publishes a Best-Of CD featuring re-recorded versions of some of the group's favorite songs.
Hacking the Spaces (2009-):
 Monochrom publishes a much-debated pamphlet by Johannes Grenzfurthner who (in collaboration with Frank Apunkt Schneider) makes a critical study on hackerspaces. In writing the historical context of hackerspaces originally expanding from the counter culture movement and conceived as niches against bourgeois society, Grenzfurthner and Schneider argue that hackerspaces today function quite differently as they initially did. Back in the seventies, these open spaces were imagined as tiny worlds to escape from capitalism or authoritarian regimes. The idea was much more based on micro-political tactics than on hippie's spirit: Instead of trying to transfer the old world into a new one people started to build up tiny new worlds with the old world. They made up open space where people could come together and try out different forms of living, working, maybe loving and whatever people do when they want to do something. In a capitalist society, alternative concepts always end up being commodified such as "indie music" becoming mainstream. According to Grenzfurthner and Schneider, the same happened to hackerspaces when "the political approach faded away on en route into tiny geeky workshop paradises".
Kiki and Bubu (2008-): 
 Invited by Boing Boing's Xeni Jardin, Monochrom created a sock puppet show focussing on the characters of Kiki and Bubu, an orange-red bird and a brown bear. Kiki is the well-read one, while Bubu is portrayed as a little slow, but often surprises with deep insights. Kiki and Bubu are fond of the ideology of Neo-Marxism and the series is based on the idea of explaining leftist terms (like commodification, neoliberalism, alienation, planned economy) in an entertaining yet surreal way.
 The first installments were short films (2008), but Monochrom also created life puppet shows (2008, 2010, 2014) and a 50-minute feature video called Kiki and Bubu: Rated R Us (2011): "Kiki and Bubu have some feelings, so they sign up for an online dating site. When the People of China want to become their friends, they are excited. However, sending the People of China a video of themselves proves to be difficult: Their content gets flagged as inappropriate and taken down from YouTube. On the long quest for knowledge that follows, Kiki and Bubu learn all about Internet censorship. And love."
Antidev - God Hates Game Designers (2012):
 Monochrom member Johannes Grenzfurthner staged a fundamentalist Christian protest, holding signs like "God Hates Game Designers" and "Thou Shalt Not Monetize Thy Neighbor" at the Game Developers Conference 2012 in San Francisco, attacking the focus on marketing and monetization. The images went viral and provoked much controversy.
Die Gstettensaga: The Rise of Echsenfriedl (2014):
 A sci-fi fantasy comedy about the post-apocalyptic world after the so-called "Google Wars". The movie was produced for Austria's TV station ORF and deals with the politics and hype behind media technology and nerd culture. The film was directed by Johannes Grenzfurthner.
Hedonistika (2014-):
 Monochrom's "smorgastic Festival for Gastrobots, Culinatronics, Advanced Snackhacks and Nutritional Mayhem", an event dedicated to approaches in gastronomical robots, cooking machines, molecular cuisine and experimental food performances. The first installment was presented in Montréal at the 'Biennale internationale d'art numérique'. The second installment was presented in Holon, near Tel Aviv, at 'Print Screen Festival', and in Linz at Ars Electronica 2022.
monochrom's ISS (2011): 
 Monochrom creates an improv reality sitcom for theater stages portraying the first year of operation of the International Space Station. The show depicts day-to-day working life in outer space and asks questions about work under the special conditions (and impairments) of a space station, to come to terms with weightlessness and the dictatorship of the functional. The production features actor Jeff Ricketts.
Creative Class Escort Service (Kreativlaufhaus) (2015): 
 Monochrom offered an escort service for creative workers (like writers, sculptors, curators, art theorists, filmmakers, designers). The basic concept was to run a Laufhaus, a specific form of German/Austrian brothel where sex workers rent a room and offer services. Monochrom also transported creative workers to clients off-site. Monochrom wanted to start a public debate about the working conditions in art and the sex work field.
Occupy East India Trading Company (2015):
 At the annual TEDxVienna conference, members of Monochrom entered the Volkstheater in 17th-century costumes, carrying a sign and pamphlets protesting the East India Company. The group wanted to address the history of global corporations, especially at a corporate-sponsored event as TEDx: "The East India Company – the first great multinational corporation, and the first to run amok – was the ultimate model for many of today's joint-stock corporations."
Shingal, where are you? (2016):
 Set in an abandoned coal mine at the Turkish border, the documentary Shingal, where are you? weaves together the stories of Yezidi refugees following ISIS attacks and the kidnapping of more than 3000 women and children. The story is told in raw cinematography from the parallel perspective of three generations of Yezidis. The film was directed by Angelos Rallis and Hans Ulrich Goessl. Monochrom functioned as the co-production company.
Traceroute (2016):
 A documentary about the history, politics, and impact of nerd culture. It was written and directed by Johannes Grenzfurthner.
Anima Ex Machina (2020):
 The novel Anima Ex Machina is a good example of Monochrom's history as publisher. The German science fiction and fantasy writer Michael Marrak was invited to Vienna as an artist-in-residence in September and October 2020. He created the sci-fi novel Anima Ex Machina, which was then published by Monochrom. The novel was nominated for the Kurd Laßwitz Award, possibly the best-known science fiction award from Germany.
Glossary of Broken Dreams (2018): 
 An essayistic feature film by Johannes Grenzfurthner that tries to present an overview of political concepts such as freedom, privacy, identity, resistance, etc. The film features performances by Amber Benson, Max Grodenchik, Jason Scott, Maschek, Jeff Ricketts and others.
Masking Threshold (2021):
 A horror drama film directed by Johannes Grenzfurthner, written by Grenzfurthner and Samantha Lienhard. The synopsis: "Conducting a series of experiments in his makeshift home-lab, a skeptical IT worker tries to cure his harrowing hearing impairment. But where will his research lead him? Masking Threshold combines a chamber play, a scientific procedural, an unpacking video and a DIY YouTube channel while suggesting endless vistas of existential pain and decay."
Razzennest (2022):
 A horror comedy film written and directed by Johannes Grenzfurthner. South African filmmaker and enfant terrible Manus Oosthuizen meets with film critic Babette Cruickshank in a Los Angeles sound studio. With key members of Manus's crew joining, they record an audio commentary track for his new "elegiac feature documentary Razzennest." Strange incidents occur during the recording session.
Je Suis Auto (to be released 2023):
Chase Masterson and Johannes Grenzfurthner portray the main characters in Monochrom's science fiction comedy film "Je Suis Auto", directed by Juliana Neuhuber. Masterson is voicing the title character "Auto", a self-driving taxi, and Grenzfurthner plays Herbie Fuchsel, an unemployed nerd critical of artificial intelligence. The film is a farcical comedy that deals with issues such as artificial intelligence, politics of labor, and tech culture.

Publications (incomplete) 

 monochrom / magazine and yearbook series. Published in 1993, 1994, 1995, 1996, 1997, 1998, 2000, 2004, 2006, 2007, 2010
 Stadt der Klage (Michael Marrak, 1997)
 Weg der Engel (Michael Marrak and Agus Chuadar, 1998)
 Who shot Immanence? (edited together with Thomas Edlinger and Fritz Ostermayer, 2002)
 Leutezeichnungen (edited together with Elffriede, 2003)
 Das Wesen der Tonalität (Othmar Steinbauer; edited by Guenther Friesinger, Helmut Neumann, Ursula Petrik, Dominik Sedivy, 2006)
 Quo Vadis, Logo?! (edited by Günther Friesinger and Johannes Grenzfurthner, 2006)
 Sonne Busen Hammer 16 (edited by Johannes Grenzfurthner, Günther Friesinger and Franz Ablinger, 2006)
 Als die Welt noch unterging (Frank Apunkt Schneider, 2007)
 VIPA (edited by Orhan Kipcak, 2007)
 Spektakel - Kunst - Gesellschaft (edited by Stephan Grigat, Johannes Grenzfurthner and Günther Friesinger, 2006)
 Sonne Busen Hammer 17 (edited by Johannes Grenzfurthner, Günther Friesinger and Fra21nz Ablinger, 2007)
 Roboexotica (edited by Günther Friesinger, Magnus Wurzer, Johannes Grenzfurthner, Franz Ablinger and Chris Veigl, 2008)
 Die Leiden der Neuen Musik (Ursula Petrik; edited by Guenther Friesinger, Helmut Neumann, Ursula Petrik, Dominik Sedivy, 2009)
 Do Androids Sleep with Electric Sheep? (edited by Johannes Grenzfurthner, Günther Friesinger, Daniel Fabry und Thomas Ballhausen, 2009)
 Of Intercourse and Intracourse – Sexuality, Biomodification and the Techno-Social Sphere (edited by Johannes Grenzfurthner, Günther Friesinger, Daniel Fabry, 2011)
 pr0nnovation? Pornography and Technological Innovation (edited by Johannes Grenzfurthner, Günther Friesinger and Daniel Fabry, 2008)
 Screw the System (edited by Johannes Grenzfurthner, Günther Friesinger, Daniel Fabry)
 Subvert Subversion. Politischer Widerstand als kulturelle Praxis (edited by Johannes Grenzfurthner, Günther Friesinger, 2020)
 The Wonderful World of Absence (edited by Günther Friesinger, Johannes Grenzfurthner, Daniel Fabry, 2011)
 Anima Ex Machina by Michael Marrak (edited by Günther Friesinger, Johannes Grenzfurthner, 2021)
 Femi und die Fische by Tommy Schmidt (edited by Günther Friesinger, Johannes Grenzfurthner, 2022)

Filmography (feature-length films) 
Hacking at Leaves (to be released 2023) – directed by Johannes Grenzfurthner
Je Suis Auto (to be released 2023) – directed by Johannes Grenzfurthner and Juliana Neuhuber
Razzennest (to be released 2022) – directed by Johannes Grenzfurthner
Masking Threshold (2021) – directed by Johannes Grenzfurthner
Glossary of Broken Dreams (2018) – directed by Johannes Grenzfurthner
Traceroute (2016) – directed by Johannes Grenzfurthner
Die Gstettensaga: The Rise of Echsenfriedl (2014) – directed by Johannes Grenzfurthner
Kiki and Bubu: Rated R Us (2011) - directed by Johannes Grenzfurthner

Exhibitions and festivals (examples) 

 Arad-II, Art Basel Miami Beach / USA (2005)
 Die waren früher auch mal besser: monochrom (1993-2013) / Austria (2013)
 Dilettanten. Forum Stadtpark, Graz / Austria - Steiermärkisches Landesmuseum Joanneum, Graz / Austria - Steirischer Herbst 2002, Graz / Austria (2002)
 Junge Szene 98. Vereinigung Bildender Künstler, Wiener Secession, Vienna / Austria (1998)
 MEDIA FORUM/Moscow International Film Festival / Moscow / Russia (2008)
 Neoist World Congress. Kunsthalle Exnergasse, Vienna / Austria (1997)
 Roboexotica (Festival for Cocktail Robotics, Vienna, 1999-)
 Robotronika. Public Netbase t0 Media~Space!, Institut für neue Kulturtechnologien, Vienna / Austria (1998)
 Seriell Produziertes. Diagonale (Austrian Film Festival), Graz / Austria (2000)
 techno(sexual) bodies / videotage / Hong Kong / China (2010)
 The Influencers, Center for Contemporary Culture / Barcelona / Spain (2008)
 The Thomann Project. São Paulo Art Biennial, São Paulo / Brazil (2002)
 Unterspiel, Contemporary Art Gallery, Vancouver / Canada (2005)
 world-information.org. Museum of Contemporary Art, Brussels / Belgium (2000) and Belgrad / Serbia (2003)

Awards (examples) 

1st prize of 'E55' (Vienna/Berlin) 1999.
aniMotion Award Honorary Mention (Sibiu, Romania) for Interactive Tales for Monochrom's "Soviet Unterzoegersdorf/Sector 1/The Adventure Game" (2007).
Art Award of FWF Austrian Science Fund (2013).
Coca-Cola Light Art Edition (2006).
Media Forum/Moscow International Film Festival, Jury Special Mention (Moscow, Russia) for Monochrom's "The Void's Foaming Ebb", (2008).
Nestroy Theatre Prize (Vienna) 2005 (together with 'The Great Television Swindle' by maschek and 'Freundschaft' by Steinhauer and Henning) for Udo 77 (2004).
Official Honoree for NetArt and Personal Blog/Culture in The 2009 Webby Awards, International Academy of Digital Arts and Sciences (2009).
Videomedeja Awards Special Mention, Novi Sad, Serbia for Net/Software Category for Monochrom's "Soviet Unterzoegersdorf/Sector 1/The Adventure Game" (2006).

See also

Notes

References

External links 

 Detailed Interview with Johannes Grenzfurthner of Monochrom (by Marc Da Costa/Furtherfield): part 1, part 2 and part 3
Monochrom in English
Monochrom in German (different blogs, information, etc. available than on the English site)
TEDx talk by Johannes Grenzfurthner on Monochrom, art and subversion

 
Organizations established in 1993
1993 establishments in Austria
Cultural organisations based in Austria
Austrian artist groups and collectives
Austrian activists
Austrian bloggers
Austrian contemporary artists
Postmodern artists
Culture jamming
Hoaxes in Austria
Hoaxes in Germany
Hoaxes in the United States
Political art
Politics and technology
Underground publishers
Anti-consumerist groups
Anti-corporate activism
Internet-based activism
Robotic art
Performance artist collectives
Culture jamming techniques
Impostors
Hacker culture
Nerd culture
Net.artists
Film production companies of Austria
Webby Award winners
Creative Commons-licensed authors
Artist residencies